The American Midwest Conference (AMC) is a college athletic conference affiliated with the National Association of Intercollegiate Athletics (NAIA) with 10 member institutions located in Arkansas and Missouri in the United States.

History

The conference began as the Show-Me Conference in 1986, then changed to its current name in 1994, reflecting that its footprint had expanded beyond Missouri.

Chronological timeline
 1986 - The American Midwest Conference was founded as the Show-Me Conference. Charter members included Columbia College of Missouri, Hannibal–LaGrange College (now Hannibal–LaGrange University), Harris-Stowe State College (now Harris-Stowe State University), Missouri Baptist College (now Missouri Baptist University), and Park College (now Park University) beginning the 1986-87 academic year.
 1987 - McKendree College (now McKendree University) joined the Show-Me in the 1987-88 academic year.
 1990 - Fontbonne left the Show-Me and the NAIA to fully align with the Division III ranks of the National Collegiate Athletic Association (NAIA) and the St. Louis Intercollegiate Athletic Conference (SLIAC) after the 1989-90 academic year.
 1993 - Iowa Wesleyan College (now Iowa Wesleyan University), Lindenwood College (now Lindenwood University) and William Woods College (now William Woods University) joined the Show-Me in the 1993-94 academic year.
 1994 - Park left the Show-Me to join the Midlands Collegiate Athletic Conference (MCAC) for most sports, while its men's basketball team had become an NAIA Independent after the 1993-94 academic year.
 1994 - The Show-Me Conference was renamed as the American Midwest Conference in the 1994-95 academic year.
 1995 - Iowa Wesleyan left the American Midwest to join the Midwest Classic Conference after the 1994-95 academic year.
 1996 - Lindenwood left the American Midwest to join the Heart of America Athletic Conference (HAAC) after the 1995-96 academic year.
 2001 - Williams Baptist College (now Williams Baptist University) joined the American Midwest in the 2001-02 academic year.
 2003 - The University of Illinois at Springfield joined the American Midwest in the 2003-04 academic year.
 2008 - Stephens College joined the American Midwest in the 2008-09 academic year.
 2009 - Park re-joined back to the American Midwest in the 2009-10 academic year.
 2011 - McKendree left the American Midwest and the NAIA to join the NCAA Division II ranks as an NCAA D-II Independent (which would later join the Great Lakes Valley Conference (GLVC) beginning the 2012-13 academic year) after the 2010-11 academic year.
 2011 - Benedictine University at Springfield joined the American Midwest in the 2011-12 academic year.
 2012 - Lyon College joined the American Midwest in the 2012-13 academic year.
 2013 - Freed–Hardeman University and Mid-Continent University joined the American Midwest in the 2013-14 academic year.
 2014 - Mid-Continent left the American Midwest after spending one season, as the school announced that it would close after the 2013-14 academic year.
 2014 - Lindenwood University at Belleville and the St. Louis College of Pharmacy (now the University of Health Sciences and Pharmacy in St. Louis, a.k.a. UHSP) joined the American Midwest in the 2014-15 academic year.
 2015 - Benedictine–Springfield left the American Midwest, as the school announced that it would close after the 2014-15 academic year.
 2015 - Central Baptist College joined the American Midwest in the 2015-16 academic year.
 2017 - Calumet College of St. Joseph and Marian University joined the American Midwest as associate members for men's wrestling in the 2017-18 academic year.
 2020 - Three institutions left the American Midwest to join their respective new home primary conferences: Freed–Hardeman to join the Mid-South Conference, Lindenwood–Belleville to cease operations, and Park to join the Heart of America Athletic Conference (HAAC), all effective after the 2019-20 academic year.
 2020 - Marian (Ind.) left the American Midwest as an associate member for men's wrestling after the 2019-20 academic year.
 2020 - Lincoln College of Illinois joined the American Midwest as an associate member for men's wrestling in the 2020-21 academic year.
 2022 - Lyon announced that it will leave the American Midwest and the NAIA to join the NCAA Division III ranks and the St. Louis Intercollegiate Athletic Conference (SLIAC) after the 2022-23 academic year. Currently Lyon competes in NCAA Division III as a provisional full independent for the 2022-23 academic year. Also, Iowa Wesleyan will rejoin the American Midwest in the 2023-24 academic year. 
 2022 - Cottey College joined the American Midwest from the AII/Continental ranks in the 2022-23 academic year.

Member schools

Current members
The American Midwest currently has ten full members, all but one are private schools. Departing members are highlighted in pink:

Notes

Future member
The American Midwest will have one future full member, which is also a private school:

Notes

Former members
The American Midwest had eleven former full members, all but one were private schools:

Notes

Former associate members
The American Midwest had two former associate members, both were private schools:

Notes

Membership timeline

Sports

References

External links